Vilim Messner (11 April 1904 – 5 June 1988) was a Croatian athlete. He competed in the men's javelin throw at the 1928 Summer Olympics, representing Yugoslavia.

References

1904 births
1988 deaths
Athletes (track and field) at the 1928 Summer Olympics
Yugoslav male javelin throwers
Croatian male javelin throwers
Olympic athletes of Yugoslavia
People from Požega, Croatia
People from the Kingdom of Croatia-Slavonia